I'm Your Pusher may refer to: 
I'm Your Pusher (Ice-T song)
I'm Your Pusher (Scooter song)
"I'm Your Pusher" (The Boys Presents: Diabolical episode)